Pasni Fish Harbour is located in Pasni, Balochistan, Pakistan, operated by the Government of Balochistan.

See also 
 Port of Pasni
 List of fish harbours of Pakistan
 Karachi Fisheries Harbour Authority 
 Fisheries Research and Training Institute, Lahore Pakistan

External links
 Four fish harbours planned - DAWN.com
 Sindh Coastal and Inland Community Development Project
 A brief on Fisheries in Pakistan

Fish harbours of Pakistan